The 1992 Paris Open was a men's tennis tournament played on indoor carpet courts. It was the 20th edition of the Paris Masters, and was part of the ATP Super 9 of the 1992 ATP Tour. It took place at the Palais omnisports de Paris-Bercy in Paris, France, from 2 November through 9 November 1992. Ninth-seeded Boris Becker won the singles title.

Finals

Singles

 Boris Becker defeated  Guy Forget, 7–6(7–3), 6–3, 3–6, 6–3 
 It was Boris Becker's 4th singles title of the year and the 35th of his career.

Doubles

 John McEnroe /  Patrick McEnroe defeated  Patrick Galbraith /  Danie Visser, 6–4, 6–2

References

External links
 ATP tournament profile
 Official website